Harold L. Martin Sr. Ph.D. (born October 22, 1951) is an American engineer, educator, former chancellor of Winston-Salem State and current chancellor of North Carolina Agricultural and Technical State University. He is the first alumnus in the history of North Carolina A&T to hold the position of Chancellor. Under his leadership, N.C. A&T has become the nation's largest historically black university (HBCU), its top-ranked public HBCU and North Carolina's third most productive public research university. It has also increased its standing as a land-grant institution and doctoral research university.

Early life and education
Martin, a native of Winston-Salem, North Carolina, received both his bachelor's and Master of Science degrees in electrical engineering from North Carolina A&T. He later earned a doctoral degree in electrical engineering from Virginia Tech in 1980.

Career
Martin's career in education began at his alma mater, North Carolina A&T, where he worked in various capacities within the school's electrical engineering department; including serving as dean of the College of engineering from 1989 to 1994. He would later be appointed to the position of Vice Chancellor of academic affairs of the university, where he served from 1994 to 1999.

In 2000, Martin was appointed chancellor of Winston-Salem State University. Under the Martin administration, the university's enrollment nearly doubled, from 2,796 to 5,556. In addition, freshman SAT scores increased by nearly 70 points, and the campus underwent a dramatic physical transformation made possible in part by a $45 Million Higher Education Bond Program in 2000. He was also credited with forging stronger working relationships with internal and external constituencies, raising the quality and breadth of academic degree programs, launching programs to improve student retention and graduation rates, and upgrading the campus' technology.

In 2006, Martin would step down from the leadership of Winston-Salem State University and become senior vice president for academic affairs at The University of North Carolina, General Administration. While there, Martin oversaw the development and implementation of the University’s academic mission, including teaching, research, international programs and student affairs.

On May 22, 2009, Martin was elected as the twelfth Chancellor of North Carolina A&T State University, making him the first alumnus to serve in the position. Under Martin's leadership, the university has developed a strategic plan aimed to position the North Carolina A&T to become a premier institution of higher learning and research on a state, national, and international level. The plan entitled "A&T Preeminence 2020," identifies six specific goals including the increase of diversity and research activity within the university. That plan led the university on a path of steady enrollment growth, reorganization of its academic programs, significant improvement in the academic profile of incoming students, growth in research funding and enhanced performance in its intercollegiate athletics program. With many of the plan's goals already achieved, the university introduced a successor plan in 2018, "A&T Preeminence: Taking the Momentum to 2023," that features new stretch goals, including expanding overall enrollment to 14,000.

In summer 2019, Martin marked his 10th year as chancellor of A&T. Later that fall, the university welcomed its largest student body ever, with 12,556 students from 44 states, the District of Columbia, Puerto Rico, the U.S. Virgin Islands and 68 foreign nations.

Awards and recognition
Martin has been honored with numerous awards and recognition, on both a local and national level, over the span of his career. Those honors include the Thurgood Marshall College Fund's Education Leadership Award in 2019, inclusion in the Ebony magazine Power 100 in 2015, selection as a Virginia Tech College of Engineering Distinguished Alumnus in 2010 and receipt of an Honorary Degree from Wake Forest University in 2007.

In 2012, the Winston-Salem State University Board of Trustees approved the naming of new residence hall in honor of Martin and his predecessor, Alvin J. Schexnider, who served as chancellor of the university from 1996 until 2000.

Personal life
Martin is married to his wife Davida Martin (nee Wagner). Mrs. Martin is the former county attorney for Forsyth County, North Carolina, and together she and Dr. Martin have two sons, Harold Martin Jr. and Walter Martin. Martin is also a member of Alpha Phi Alpha fraternity.

Further reading

References

External links

North Carolina A&T State University leaders
Winston-Salem State University
North Carolina State University faculty
North Carolina A&T State University faculty
University of North Carolina administrators
African-American academics
African-American engineers
21st-century American engineers
North Carolina A&T State University alumni
Virginia Tech alumni
1951 births
People from Winston-Salem, North Carolina
Living people
21st-century African-American people
20th-century African-American people